Douglas McCrory is a Democratic member of the Connecticut State Senate. He has served the 2nd district, which includes northern Hartford, Bloomfield, and Windsor since 2017. Before his election to the Senate, McCrory served as a member of the Connecticut House of Representatives from 2005 to 2017 and as a Democratic Town Committee Member in the 7th District beginning in 2002.

Early life and education
A Hartford native, McCrory earned a basketball scholarship to his hometown University of Hartford in 1988. There, he obtained his bachelor's degree. A few miles down the road, in Fairfield, Connecticut, he went on to attain an MA in elementary administration before returning to his previous alma mater to attain a second MA in business administration.

Career

Representative McCrory began his career in education at Sarah J. Rawson Elementary School in Hartford. He continued to teach but eventually became an administrator at Lewis Fox Middle School and ultimately for the Capitol Region Education Council. He continues in this capacity to this day.

Aside from his work as teacher and administrator, McCrory has also cofounded the Benjamin E. Mays Institute, which uses curriculum infused with African-American history and themes to create a positive self-image. McCrory also coaches young people in Hartford's Northend Little League, the Hartford Hurricanes and the Boys & Girls Club.

Connecticut House of Representatives
During his tenure in the House, McCrory received endorsements from the Hartford Courant and the American Federation of State, County and Municipal Employees.

McCrory cosponsored bills increasing the minimum wage, mandating sick leave, and authorizing people to record police officers among others.

2nd Senate District special election, 2017
Minutes before the commencement of the 2017 legislative session, state Senator Eric Coleman resigned to begin the Judicial Selection Commission process required of a Connecticut Supreme Court Justice. His seat newly vacant, Governor Dan Malloy called for a special election to take place on February 28. Three days before this announcement had been made official, local Democrats met to nominate their candidate. While both Town Committee Chairman received 30 out of 37 votes from Windsor and Suggs, McCrory overcame that margin with 31 of 34 from Hartford.

Although both the 2nd and 32nd Senate districts are considered respectively safe blue and red seats, each election saw more attention than usual due to the composition of the Connecticut Senate as a result of the election: 18 Democrats, 18 Republicans and a tie-breaking vote by Lieutenant Governor Nancy Wyman. Any upset could tip the balance of power in the upper chamber.

His opponents were Republican Michael McDonald, a former Windsor town council member, and Aaron Romano, progressive former Democrat and Bloomfield attorney, who ran as an unaffiliated write-in candidate. Another special election will be called by Governor Malloy to fill his now vacant seat.

Electoral history

McCrory was unopposed in both the primary and general elections in 2008.

McCrory was unopposed in both the primary and general elections in 2016.

Personal life
McCrory lives in the Blue Hills neighborhood of Hartford with his wife, a public defender, and children. They attend the Bethel African Methodist Episcopal Church in Bloomfield, Connecticut, where he was awarded Man of the Year in 2002.

References

Living people
University of Hartford alumni
Sacred Heart University alumni
African-American state legislators in Connecticut
Year of birth missing (living people)
Politicians from Hartford, Connecticut
Democratic Party members of the Connecticut House of Representatives
Democratic Party Connecticut state senators
21st-century American politicians
21st-century African-American politicians